F1 Racing Simulation is a racing simulation game, developed for Microsoft Windows by Ubisoft in 1997. The game is based on the 1996 Formula One World Championship, and is the first of the Racing Simulation games made by Ubisoft, being the predecessor to Racing Simulation 2, which was released in 1998.

Development
The game was showcased at E3 1997.

Reception

The game received "favorable" reviews, two points shy of universal acclaim, according to the review aggregation website GameRankings. Computer Games Strategy Plus gave it universal acclaim, over a month before the game was released Stateside. GameSpot wrote that F1 Racing Simulation is an extremely well made simulation racing game. Next Generation noted that the game only had the license for 1996 season, drivers and tracks in comparison to Formula 1 Championship Edition, but praised the graphics and gameplay elements.

The game was a finalist for Computer Gaming Worlds 1998 "Best Driving" award, and for GameSpots 1998 "Driving Game of the Year" award, both of which ultimately went to Need for Speed III: Hot Pursuit. PC Gamer US likewise nominated the game as the best racing game of 1998, although it lost to Motocross Madness. The game was also nominated for Best Racing Game at the 1998 CNET Gamecenter Awards, which went to Grand Prix Legends.

The game received a "Gold" award from the Verband der Unterhaltungssoftware Deutschland (VUD) in August 1998, for sales of at least 100,000 units across Germany, Austria and Switzerland. The game was a commercial failure in the U.S., with sales of 12,570 units by April 1999. Discussing this performance, Ubisoft's Tammy Schachter argued that "the install base of 3D cards was not in place for mass-market sales" when the game launched. She also cited the relative unpopularity of the Formula 1 sport in the U.S.

See also
F1 Pole Position 64, a game for the Nintendo 64 by Ubisoft, also based on the 1996 Formula One season

References

External links
 
 

1997 video games
Formula One video games
Ubisoft games
Video games developed in France
Windows games
Windows-only games
Video games set in Argentina
Video games set in Australia
Video games set in Brazil
Video games set in Belgium
Video games set in Canada
Video games set in France
Video games set in Germany
Video games set in Hungary
Video games set in Italy
Video games set in Japan
Video games set in Monaco
Video games set in Portugal
Video games set in Spain
Video games set in the United Kingdom